Eucithara gevahi is a small sea snail, a marine gastropod mollusk in the family Mangeliidae.

Description

Distribution
This marine species occurs in the Gulf of Aqaba, Northern Red Sea

References

 Singer B.S. (2012) Eucithara gevahi a new species from the Gulf of Aqaba (Gastropoda, Conoidea, Mangeliidae). Triton 26: 13-15.

External links

gevahi
Gastropods described in 2012